Dashtuk (also Romanized as Dashtūk; also known as Dashtak) is a village in Deyhuk Rural District, Deyhuk District, Tabas County, South Khorasan Province, Iran. At the 2006 census, its population was 58, in 14 families.

References 

Populated places in Tabas County